Steve Rackman is an English-born Australian actor and professional wrestler, best known for his role as Donk in the film Crocodile Dundee. In his professional wrestling career, he wrestled under the ring name of Steve 'Crusher' Rackman. Rackman was born in the United Kingdom, and worked as a doorman before he became a professional wrestler. He migrated to Australia in his teens, where he wrestled for World Championship Wrestling (Australia) on the channel Nine Network from 1973 to 1978.

Wrestling career
Rackman was a wrestler first, in the 1970's, featuring alongside Andre the Giant for a number of years before moving into acting.

Championships and accomplishments
 World Championship Wrestling (Australia)
 NWA Austra-Asian Tag Team Championship (1 time) - with The Missouri Mauler

Acting career
He was in the movie The Last of the Knucklemen in 1979, Turkey Shoot in 1982, and a string of other movies across the years.

Rackman played the role of Donk three times in the Crocodile Dundee movies - Crocodile Dundee, Crocodile Dundee II and Crocodile Dundee in Los Angeles.

References

External links
 

Australian male actors
Australian male professional wrestlers
English emigrants to Australia
English male actors
English male professional wrestlers
Living people
Security guards
Year of birth missing (living people)